Clusterin (apolipoprotein J) is a 75-80 kDa disulfide-linked heterodimeric protein associated with the clearance of cellular debris and apoptosis.  In humans, clusterin is encoded by the CLU gene on chromosome 8. CLU is a molecular chaperone responsible for aiding protein folding of secreted proteins, and its three isoforms have been differentially implicated in pro- or antiapoptotic processes. Through this function, CLU is involved in many diseases related to oxidative stress, including neurodegenerative diseases, cancers, inflammatory diseases, and aging.

Structure

The CLU gene contains nine exons and expresses three isoforms alternatively-spliced at the first exon. The encoded protein isoforms all localize to different subcellular compartments: one isoform localizes to the nucleus; a second isoform localizes to the cytoplasm; and the third is secreted from the cell. They also perform opposing functions: the nuclear CLU binds Ku70 to release BAX and induce apoptosis, whereas the cytosolic and secretory isoforms inhibit apoptosis. The nuclear isoform encodes a 49 kDa protein, while the secretory isoform, which is the main gene transcript, encodes a 75–80 kDa protein after maturation (glycosylation, secretion, and dimerization). The mature protein is a 449-residue, heterodimeric, disulfide-linked glycoprotein composed of two subunits of ~34-40 kDa α- and β-chains.

Function 

Clusterin was first identified in ram rete testis fluid where it showed signs of clustering with rat sertoli cells and erythrocytes, hence its name.

CLU is a member of the small heat shock protein family and, thus, a molecular chaperone. Unlike most other chaperone proteins, which aid intracellular proteins, CLU is a Golgi chaperone that facilitates the folding of secreted proteins in an ATP-independent way. The gene is highly conserved in species, and the protein is widely distributed in many tissues and organs, where it participates in a number of biological processes, including lipid transport, membrane recycling, cell adhesion, programmed cell death, and complement-mediated cell lysis. Overexpression of the secretory CLU isoform protects the cell from apoptosis induced by cellular stress, such as chemotherapy, radiotherapy, or androgen/estrogen depletion. CLU promotes cell survival by a number of means, including inhibition of BAX on the mitochondrial membrane, activation of the phosphatidylinositol 3-kinase/protein kinase B pathway, modulation of extracellularular signal-regulated kinase (ERK) 1/2 signaling and matrix metallopeptidase-9 expression, promotion of angiogenesis, and mediation of the nuclear factor kappa B (NF-κB) pathway. Meanwhile, its downregulation allows for p53 activation, which then skews the proapoptotic:antiapoptotic ratio of present Bcl-2 family members, resulting in mitochondrial dysfunction and cell death. p53 may also transcriptionally repress secretory CLU to further promote the proapoptotic cascade.

Clinical associations 
Two independent genome-wide association studies found a statistical association between a SNP within the clusterin gene and the risk of having Alzheimer's disease. Further studies have suggested that people who already have Alzheimer's disease have more clusterin in their blood, and that clusterin levels in blood correlate with faster cognitive decline in individuals with Alzheimer's disease, but have not found that clusterin levels predicted the onset of Alzheimer's disease. In addition to Alzheimer's disease, CLU is involved in other neurodegenerative diseases such as Huntington disease.

CLU may promote tumorigenesis by facilitating BAX-KLU70 binding and, consequently, preventing BAX from localizing to the outer mitochondrial membrane to stimulate cell death. In clear cell renal cell carcinoma, CLU functions to regulate ERK 1/2 signaling and matrix metallopeptidase-9 expression to promote tumor cell migration, invasion, and metastasis. In epithelial ovarian cancer, CLU has been observed to promote angiogenesis and chemoresistance. Other pathways CLU participates in to downplay apoptosis in tumor cells include the PI3K/AKT/mTOR pathway and NF-κB pathway. Unlike most other cancers, which feature upregulated CLU levels to enhance tumor cell survival, testicular seminoma features downregulated CLU levels, allowing for increased sensitivity to chemotherapy treatments. Other cancers CLU has been implicated in include breast cancer, pancreatic cancer, hepatocellular carcinoma, and melanoma.

As evident by its key roles in cancer development, CLU can serve as a therapeutic target for fighting tumor growth and chemoresistance. Studies revealed that inhibition of CLU resulted in increased effectiveness of chemotherapeutic agents to kill tumor cells. In particular, custirsen, an antisense oligonucleotide that blocks the CLU mRNA transcript, enhanced heat-shock protein 90 (HSP90) inhibitor activity by suppressing the heat-shock response in castrate-resistant prostate cancer, and is currently in phase III trials.

CLU activity is also involved in infectious diseases, such as hepatitis C. CLU is induced by the stress of hepatitis C viral infection, which disrupts glucose regulation. The chaperone protein then aids hepatitis C viral assembly by stabilizing its core and NS5A units. CLU expression in the kidney also plays a role in renal diseases, such as nephropathic cystinosis, which is a major cause of Fanconi syndrome. In addition to the above diseases, CLU has been linked to other conditions resulting from oxidative damage, including aging, glomerulonephritis, atherosclerosis, and myocardial infarction.

Interactions 

CLU has been shown to interact with Ku70.

References

Further reading

External links 
 
 Apolipoproteins and Applied Research

Proteins